The  gusle or lahuta is a single-stringed musical instrument (and musical style) traditionally used in the Dinarides region of Southeastern Europe (in the Balkans). The instrument is always accompanied by singing; musical folklore, specifically epic poetry. The gusle player holds the instrument vertically between his knees, with the left hand fingers on the strings. The strings are never pressed to the neck, giving a harmonic and unique sound.

Singing to the accompaniment of the Gusle as a part of Serbia's intangible cultural heritage was inscribed in 2018 on the Representative List of the Intangible Cultural Heritage of Humanity of UNESCO.

Origin
There is no consensus about the origin of the instrument. 7th-century Byzantine Greek historian Theophylact Simocatta (  630) wrote about "small lyres" brought by the Slavs who settled the Balkans; some researchers believe that this might have been the gusle. Others, such as F. Sachs, believe that the gusle has an Oriental origin, brought to Europe in the 10th century via the Islamic cultural wave. Arab travellers report evidence that the Slavs used the gusle in the 10th century. Teodosije the Hilandarian (1246–1328) wrote that Stefan Nemanjić (r. 1196–1228) often entertained the Serbian nobility with musicians with drums and "gusle". Reliable written records about the gusle appear only in the 15th century. 16th-century travel memoirs mention the instrument in Bosnia and Serbia. In the 19th- and 20th century the instrument is mentioned in Montenegro, Serbia, Bosnia, Herzegovina, Croatia and Albania where it is called Lahuta.

Etymology
The word Gusle comes from the Old Slavic word "gosl" for fiber. The Old Slavic root morpheme gǫdsli (Russian gúsli, slovak husle, Czech housle, Slovenian gósli) is associated with guditi/gósti, or gudalo/godalo, related to onomatopoeia for a low resonating sound; cf. gu(n)delj/гу(н)дељ = cockchafer, which makes such sound when flying.

The exact origin of the nominations of the related concepts gusle, gadulka, gudok and gudalo, the latter as the name for the bow of the gusle could also illuminate a more accurate assignment in the history of the Gusle after Walther Wünsch.

In the parlance of the South Slavs, in addition to the feminine plurale tantum "gusle" that has prevailed as a lexeme, even the older "gusli", which is found in the area of the middle Drina River region to Arilje and throughout Montenegro.

The singular form "gusla" is found only in Eastern Serbia, west of the Timok, around Niš, Ivanjica, as well as in the area of the Zlatibor. On Korčula only "gusla" is in use.

The term "gusle" by Alberto Fortis has been introduced into European literature. "Gusle" is in Serbo-Croatian linguistic usage, however, a feminine plurale tantum (Serbo-Croatian gusla or gusle, Albanian lahuta or lahutë).

Overview

The gusle consists of a wooden sound box, the maple being considered as the best material (therefore often the instrument is referred to as "gusle javorove" - maple gusle), covered with an animal skin and a neck with an intricately carved head. A bow is pulled over the string/s (made of horsetail), creating a dramatic and sharp sound, expressive and difficult to master. The string is made of thirty horsehairs.

The instrument is held vertically between the knees, with the left hand fingers on the neck. The strings are never pressed to the neck, giving a harmonic and unique sound. The most common and traditional version is single-stringed, while a much less-common version is the two-stringed found in Bosanska Krajina and in Lika.

The varieties of the guslar music are based on cultural basis; the content of the stories of each ethnic group is different, as different epic poems are used to accompany the instrument. There is minor differing characteristics of vocality in the regions of Southeast Europe. The design of the instrument is identical; only the design of the neck and head varies with ethnic or national motif.

Epic poetry
The gusle instrumentally accompanies heroic songs (epic poetry) in the Balkans.

Per countries

Serbia

The Serbian Gusle is a one-stringed instrument that is usually made of maple wood. A guslar is an individual capable of reproducing and composing poems about heroes and historical events to the accompaniment of this instrument, usually in the decasyllable meter. There are records of an instrument named gusle (гоусли) being played at the court of the 13th-century Serbian King Stefan Nemanjić, but it is not certain whether the term was used in its present-day meaning or it denoted some other kind of string instrument. Polish poets of the 17th century mentioned the gusle in their works. In a poem published in 1612, Kasper Miaskowski wrote that "the Serbian gusle and gaidas will overwhelm Shrove Tuesday" (Serbskie skrzypki i dudy ostatek zagluszą). In the idyll named Śpiewacy, published in 1663, Józef Bartłomiej Zimorowic used the phrase "to sing to the Serbian gusle" (przy Serbskich gęślach śpiewać). In some older Serbian books on literature it was stated that a Serbian guslar performed at the court of Władysław II Jagiełło in 1415. The earliest known Serbian guslar is referred to in 1551 by Hungarian historian Sebastian Tinody, saying, "There are many gusle players here in Hungary, but none is better at the Serbian style than Dimitrije Karaman". In addition Sebastian describes the performance, explaining that the guslar would hold the gusle between his knees and goes into a highly emotional artistic performance with a sad and dedicated expression on his face.

The gusle has played a significant role in the history of Serbian epic poetry because of its association with the centuries-old patriotic oral legacy. Most of the epics are about the era of the Ottoman occupation and the struggle for the liberation from it. With the efforts of ethnographer Vuk Stefanović Karadžić, many of these epics have been collected and published in books in the first half of the 19th century. Serbian folk poetry was given a marvelous reception, as it appeared in Europe when Romanticism was in full bloom. This poetry, which appeared in Karadžić's anthological collections, met the "expectations" of the sophisticated European audience, becoming a living confirmation of Herder's and Grimm's ideas about the oral tradition. Jacob Grimm began to learn Serbian so that he could read the poems in the original. He wrote minute analyses of each new volume of Serbian folk songs. He ranked them as being equal to the Song of Songs, as did Goethe somewhat later. Thanks to Grimm, moreover to the initiatives of the well-educated and wise Slovene Jernej Kopitar (the censor for Slavic books, Karadžić's counselor and protector), Serbian folk literature found its place in the literature of the world.

Singing to the accompaniment of the gusle as a part of Serbia's tradition was inscribed in 2018 on the Intangible Cultural Heritage Lists of UNESCO.

Bosniaks 

There are few active Bosniak Guslari today, but there were many examples in history. Guslari were always guests at the Bosniak beg's courtyards, and it was with Gusle they performed Bosniak heroic songs about prominent figures or events. In these songs were Đerzelez Alija, Mujo Hrnjica, Mustaj Beg of Lika The Battle of Banja Luka or the Battle at Očakov. 

Avdo Međedović, who was a Slavic-speaking Muslim of Albanian origin, was the most versatile and skillful guslar encountered by Milman Parry and Albert Lord during their research in the oral epic tradition of Bosnia, Herzegovina and Montenegro in the 1930s. At Parry's request, Avdo sang songs he already knew and some songs he heard in front of Parry, convincing him that someone Homer-like could produce a poem so long. Avdo dictated, over five days, a version of the well-known theme The Wedding of Meho Smailagić that was 12,323 lines long, saying on the fifth day to Nikola (Parry's assistant on the journey) that he knew even longer songs. On another occasion, he sang over several days an epic of 13,331 lines. He said he had several others of similar length in his repertoire. In Parry's first tour, over 80,000 lines were transcribed.

Montenegro

Gusle are a national instrument in Montenegro and fundamental to national music, folklore and tradition. In carving the instrument, special attention is given to the head, so on Montenegrin gusle, one can find a large number of carved shapes; most often it is a double-headed eagle, like the one from the state heraldry, the shape of the mountain Lovcen, or the characters from the Montenegrin history, such as Petar II Petrović Njegoš.

Among the most famous Montenegrin contemporary guslar poets is Đorđije Koprivica, who started playing gusle at the age of five. He played around the world including Canada, United States, Australia and Europe.

Albania

The lahuta is used by Gheg Albanians of northernmost Albania (Malësia) for the singing of epic songs or Albanian Songs of the Frontier Warriors. The instrument was very common in Kosovo and Albania, specially in the mountain regions such as Malsia. In Albanian types, the lutes head is often carved after a goats head or a hawk, the latter representing the Albanian flag.

It is played by a lahutar, a rapsode. The Albanian songs are octosyllable, in relation to the decasyllable Serbian, and a more primitive type of rhyming is regular.

The use of lahuta is traditionally mastered in the Highlands and Malësi e Madhe District.
Gjergj Fishta, the Albanian national poet and priest, wrote the book Lahuta e Malcis which is often played with a lahuta. The famous Albanian song about Gjergj Elez Alia, the Albanian mythological hero who slays a beast that rises from the sea, is also played with a lahuta.

Croatia

The gusle has been used by the Croats in Herzegovina, Dalmatia, Lika, as well as in Bosnia and Western Bosnia as an accompaniment for epic poetry for hundreds of years. Often they were constructed by the singers and players themselves, shepherds or even by specialized gusle builders from urban areas. Most lyrics center around historical figures who played an important role in Croatian history (often folk heroes who died tragic deaths, such as hajduks) or significant historical events (mostly battles against invaders or occupying powers).

Perhaps the most famous Croatian guslar poets was Andrija Kačić Miošić, an 18th-century monk who created and collected many gusle lyrics and songs throughout the regions, which are still sung today. Croatia's most famous contemporary guslar is Mile Krajina.
 
Although gusle are not a part of mainstream popular music, the instrument has been included into songs by some musicians such as Marko Perković Thompson, Mate Bulić and Dario Plevnik. Gusle recordings can be heard on a number of CD compilations published by Croatian ethnologists, which are in most cases distributed locally by the artists themselves.

See also 
 Berimbau

References

Sources

Further reading

 Milošević-Đorđević, Nada, The History of Serbian Culture. Porthill Publishers, Edgware, Middiesex, 1995.
 Kos, Koraljka,  Das Volksinstrument “gusle” in der bildenden Kunst des 19. Jahrhundert. Zum Wandel eines ikonographischen Motivs, Glazba, ideje i društvo / Music, Ideas, and Society. Svečani zbornik za Ivana Supičića / Essays in Honour of Ivan Supičić, ur. S. Tuksar, HMD, Zagreb 1993, 113–124.
 Kos, Koraljka,  Representations of the Gusle in Nineteenth-Century Visual Arts, RidIM/RCMI Newsletter XX/2 (New York 1995) 13–18.
 Milne Holton and Vasa D. Mihailovich. Serbian Poetry from the Beginnings to the Present. New Haven: Yale Center for International and Area Studies, 1988.
 Beatrice L. Stevenson, The Gusle Singer and His Songs. (with "Heroic Ballads of Serbia"), American Anthropologist 1915 Vol.17:58-68.

External links

The History of Serbian Culture, translated by Randall A. Major
Guslarskepesme.com, repository of gusle song texts 
Peter Boro performing Croatian music on the gusle and misnice, 1939, US Library of Congress

One-string fiddles
Drumhead lutes
Necked bowl lutes
Bowed monochords
Albanian musical instruments
Croatian musical instruments
Serbian musical instruments
Bosnian musical instruments
Montenegrin musical instruments